Mickle Mere is a 17 hectare nature reserve south of Ixworth in Suffolk. It is managed by the Suffolk Wildlife Trust.

This area of open water and wet meadows has diverse bird life such as lapwings, kestrels, little egrets and reed buntings, and mammals include water voles and otters.

There is access from Mill Road.

References

Suffolk Wildlife Trust